Malegaon Fort is a land fort located in the town of Malegaon. It is located 104 km from Nashik, in Nashik district, of Maharashtra. The fort is on the north bank of the Mausam river, which is a tributary of the Girna river. It was built during the Maratha Empire.

History
Malegaon Fort was constructed in 1740 by Naro Shankar Raje Bahadur, general of the Peshwa. He was appointed as an agent in Malwa. He was gifted 18 villages which included Malewadi. Craftsmen were brought in from Surat and northern India to build the fort, the construction of which took 25 years. After the fort was completed, the craftsmen settled in the town. 

In 1816, a Rohilla sepoy named Dilawar Khan constructed the first Eidgah in the town. 

After the fall of Trymbakgad fort on 24 May 1818, Malegaon Fort was besieged on 16 May 1818 by the East India Company.

How to reach
The fort is located within the town of Malegaon. Malegaon is located on the Mumbai-Agra National highway NH-3. The fort is also known as the Raje Bahadur Wada. It is close to the Ramsetu bridge. The fort is open to the public between 10 am  and 5 pm. At present, there is a Marathi high school in the premises of the fort.

Places to see
The fort is in good condition.  The height of the inner wall is 60 feet. The fort has lofty entrance doors. The thickness of the walls is about six feet. There are two cannons at the entrance door and a hexagonal well inside the fort. It takes about an hour to see the fort.

Gallery

See also 
 List of forts in Maharashtra
 List of forts in India
 Peshwa
 Marathi People
 List of Maratha dynasties and states
 Maratha War of Independence
 Battles involving the Maratha Empire
 Maratha Army
 Maratha titles
 Military history of India
 List of people involved in the Maratha Empire

References 

Buildings and structures of the Maratha Empire
Forts in Nashik district
16th-century forts in India
Tourist attractions in Nashik district